Tim Pütz (born 19 November 1987) is a German professional tennis player who specialises in doubles.

He reached his career-high doubles ranking of world No. 7 on 29 August 2022, and has won seven doubles titles on the ATP Tour, most notably the 2021 Paris Masters alongside Michael Venus. Pütz has also reached three Grand Slam quarterfinals in doubles. In singles, he has a career-high ranking of world No. 163, achieved in February 2015, and reached the second round at the 2014 Wimbledon Championships. 

Pütz has represented Germany in the Davis Cup since 2017, most notably reaching the semifinals in 2021. He also competed at the 2020 Olympic Games alongside Kevin Krawietz.

Professional career

2014: ATP debut in singles
Pütz made his ATP Tour main-draw singles debut at Wimbledon. As a qualifier, he defeated Teymuraz Gabashvili in the first round. He lost to Fabio Fognini in four sets in the next round.

2017: Davis Cup debut
Pütz  played in the Davis Cup for the first time. He helped the German team to win over Portugal in the World Group play-offs by winning the doubles rubber with partner Jan-Lennard Struff.

2018: First ATP title
In the first round of the 2018 Davis Cup, Pütz and Struff beat the Australian duo John Peers and Matthew Ebden to set Germany on their way to victory. Although Pütz and Struff won again in the Davis Cup quarterfinals against the Spaniards Feliciano López and Marc López, their team lost the tie with 2–3.

In June, Pütz won his first title on the ATP Tour at the Stuttgart Open in doubles, partnering Philipp Petzschner as a wild card entry.

2019: Second ATP title
Pütz won his second doubles title with partner Frederik Nielsen at the Bavarian International Tennis Championships in Munich.

2020: First French Open quarterfinal
Pütz reached his first Grand Slam quarterfinal at the 2020 French Open partnering also with Frederik Nielsen where they lost to world No. 1 and top seeded Columbian pair of Farah/Cabal.

2021: Second French Open quarterfinal, first Masters title, top 20 debut
Pütz won his third doubles title at the Estoril Open, partnering Hugo Nys. 

He reached his first semifinal in doubles at a Masters 1000 at the Madrid Open, partnering with compatriot Alexander Zverev, but they withdrew from the match. Later in May, Pütz won his fourth doubles title at the Lyon Open, again with Nys.

The Pütz/Nys duo reached the quarterfinals of the French Open where they were defeated by Kazakh duo Bublik/Golubev.

In July, partnering with Michael Venus, he won his fifth title and his first at an ATP 500 tournament at the Hamburg European Open.

He and Venus got to the semifinals of the Indian Wells Masters. 

He won his first ATP Masters 1000 title at the Paris Masters, again with Venus. As a result, he reached a new doubles career-high of No. 17 in November 2021.

2022: Australian Open quarterfinal, Masters final, World No. 7 
Seeded sixth, Pütz reached the quarterfinals of the Australian Open, partnering again with Venus, where they were defeated by eventual champions Thanasi Kokkinakis / Nick Kyrgios. On 21 March, he broke into the top ten for the first time, ranked at world No. 9.

After a final showing at the 2022 Western & Southern Open partnering again with Venus, he reached world No. 7 in the doubles rankings on 29 August 2022.

Performance timelines

Singles

Doubles
Current through the 2023 Dubai Championships.

Mixed doubles

Significant finals

Masters 1000 finals

Doubles: 2 (1 title, 1 runner-up)

ATP Tour finals

Doubles: 12 (7 titles, 5 runner-ups)

ATP Challenger and ITF Futures finals

Singles: 13 (7–6)

Doubles: 31 (19–12)

National participation

Davis Cup (13–1)

ATP Cup  (1–1)

References

External links
 
 
 

1987 births
Living people
German male tennis players
Tennis players from Frankfurt
Olympic tennis players of Germany
Tennis players at the 2020 Summer Olympics
21st-century German people